Catwoman is an action-adventure video game based on the 2004 film of the same name based on the fictional character. It features the likeness of the film's lead actress, Halle Berry; the character's voice is provided by actress Jennifer Hale.

Gameplay

The game is third person action platformer where the player must use the heroine's cat-like strength and agility to travel through various environments and defeat various enemies. There is also sense exploration in the game, similar to the Tomb Raider series. Catwoman can climb up walls and swing from metal poles to navigate through the environment. Catwoman must also solve puzzles at certain parts of the game to advance further.  The game also features a combat system for when fighting enemies. The player is able to upgrade moves and perform simple combo strings.

Plot
The game loosely follows the story of the movie. Patience Phillips, a shy office worker in the Hedare corporate empire, accidentally discovers her employers' dark secret and is subsequently murdered. She is then revived by a supernatural Egyptian cat granting her cat-like abilities. Now reborn as "Catwoman," she then embarks on a tale of revenge against the people who nearly murdered her.

Reception

Catwoman received negative reviews from critics due to problems including bad camera control, poor voice-work, and an over-simplistic combat system. However, the Game Boy Advance version received mixed reviews with aggregating review website Metacritic giving the version 61/100. The GameCube version ranked in at 47/100, the PC version with 46/100, the PlayStation 2 version with 46/100 and the Xbox version with 45/100.

Notes

References

External links
 

2004 video games
Action-adventure games
Argonaut Games games
Batman (1989 film series)
Electronic Arts games
Game Boy Advance games
Magic Pockets games
Multiplayer and single-player video games
GameCube games
PlayStation 2 games
Superheroine video games
Catwoman in other media
Video games based on DC Comics
Video games based on films
Video games based on adaptations
Video games developed in France
Video games developed in the United Kingdom
Video games scored by James Hannigan
Video games featuring female protagonists
Windows games
Xbox games
Video games set in the United States
Video games featuring black protagonists